{{Infobox television
| image          =
| camera         = 
| picture_format = PALHDTV 1080i
| audio_format   = 
| runtime        = 90 seconds
| creator        = BBC News
| presenter      = Ellie CrisellRiz Lateef Sophie LongSam Naz
| country        = United Kingdom
| location       = Broadcasting House, London
| language       = English
| network        = BBC One
| first_aired    = 
| last_aired     = 
| related        = BBC BreakfastBBC News at OneBBC News at SixBBC News at Ten 
}}

The BBC News Summary is a news update created by BBC News.

Like other BBC News bulletins it was presented by a sole newsreader, on Monday to Thursday it was usually Ellie Crisell and on Friday Riz Lateef. After a minute of brief national and international news, a regional presenter provided 30 seconds of regional news headlines and a brief local weather forecast; on BBC One HD in England a national weather forecast was broadcast instead due to there being no regional variations. The 9:00pm edition was a pre-recorded preview to BBC News at Ten. The 90 second bulletin was axed by the BBC on 30 May 2018. This made the news summary similar to the now defunct BBC Three's 60 Seconds, but ran for 30 seconds longer (as BBC Three has no regional continuity).

History
Originally BBC news summaries were broadcast during the day and were launched as part of the BBC's new daytime TV service. The first broadcasts took place on 8 December 1986. Lasting for three minutes, the hourly or near-hourly bulletins formed the backbone of the new service. Morning summaries were broadcast on BBC1 and early afternoon summaries were transmitted on BBC2. Each bulletin was followed by a weather forecast. The final afternoon news summary of the day, broadcast at around 3.50pm, was followed by a regional news bulletin. In October 1990, regional hourly news bulletins started to be broadcast immediately after the BBC1 morning summaries. By the end of the 1990s the summaries were broadcast less frequently and they were phased out altogether during the 2000s.

These summaries are not to be confused with generic BBC News bulletins broadcast over BBC One and BBC Two at weekends and holidays.

BBC One 8pm News Summary
In May 2007 Natasha Kaplinsky and Suzanne Virdee presented a new peaktime summary during its initial pilot in the Midlands. The intention was originally to target the young, professional and working markets. It was broadcast on weeknights at 8:00pm on BBC One.

In October 2007 Natasha Kaplinsky left BBC News, and Kate Silverton was announced as the launch presenter. Initially, the presenter of the BBC News at Six or BBC News at Ten presented Friday editions, but Ellie Crisell later became the Friday presenter.

In February 2008 Silverton left the update to present BBC News at One and was replaced by Crisell, who took maternity leave the following month. During this time Riz Lateef and Celina Hinchcliffe presented the update, while others including Sophie Long and Luisa Baldini also appeared.

On 21 April 2008 the summary got a new logo and graphics as part of a BBC News relaunch. In October 2008 Crisell returned to the update. Riz Lateef became the new Friday and relief presenter.

On 18 March 2013, the programme moved to Broadcasting House, along with the BBC News Channel and the other BBC One bulletins, and began broadcasting in high-definition.

The final BBC One 8pm News Summary was aired on 30 May 2018.

Final Presenters (BBC One 8pm News Summary)
Main presenter of the networked 8pm bulletin - Ellie Crisell - left the summary for South East Today and since then multiple presenters hosted in a rotation, consisting of:

Monday & Tuesday:
 Alice Bhandhukravi, Relief presenter (2015–2018)
 Victoria Hollins, Relief presenter (2015–2018)

Wednesday
 Tina Daheley, Presenter (2016–2018)

Thursday: (alternating)
 Sophie Long, presenter (2008–2018)
Elaine Dunkley, presenter (2015-2018)
 Sangita Myska, presenter (2015–2018)

Friday:
 Sima Kotecha, presenter (2015–2018)

 Regional Presenters 
The BBC One English Regions had their own teams of Presenters rotating throughout each week in a similar fashion, including the Look East TV region consisting of both BBC One East (East) and BBC One East (West).

Former National 8pm News Summary Presenters
If there is no position before the years of being a presenter, this newsreader was either a relief presenter or occasional stand-in presenter.

 Natasha Kaplinsky Main presenter during trial period (2007)
 Luisa Baldini (2007–2008)
 Maryam Moshiri (2008–2009)
 Celina Hinchcliffe Main presenter (2008–2012)
 George Alagiah (2008–2013)
 Fiona Bruce (2008–2013)
 Sian Williams (2012–2013)
 Sophie Raworth (2009–2013)
 Kate Silverton Main presenter (2007)
 Ellie Crisell Main presenter (2008–2015)
Riz Lateef (2008–13)

See also
 60 Seconds''
 BBC News

References

BBC television news shows
1986 British television series debuts
2018 British television series endings
1990s British television series
2000s British television series
2010s British television series